Zizhou or Zi Prefecture (資州) was a zhou (prefecture) in imperial China centering around modern Zizhong County, Sichuan, China. It existed (intermittently) from 587 until 1913.

Geography
The administrative region of Zizhou in the Tang dynasty is in modern eastern Sichuan. It probably includes parts of modern: 
Under the administration of Neijiang:
Zizhong County
Neijiang
Under the administration of Ziyang:
Ziyang

References
 

Prefectures of Former Shu
Prefectures of the Tang dynasty
Prefectures of Later Tang
Prefectures of the Sui dynasty
Prefectures of Later Shu
Prefectures of the Song dynasty
Prefectures of the Yuan dynasty
Departments of the Qing dynasty
Former prefectures in Sichuan